Prays stratella is a moth in the  family Plutellidae.

References

External links
 Prays stratella at www.catalogueoflife.org.

Yponomeutidae
Moths described in 1877